Ma Tovu (Hebrew for "O How Good" or "How Goodly") is a prayer in Judaism, expressing reverence and awe for synagogues and other places of worship.

Its first line of praise is a quote of Balaam's blessing and is thus the only prayer commonly used in Jewish services that was written by a non-Jew. The remainder of the text is derived from passages in Psalms relating to entering the house of worship and preparation for further prayer (and ). In this vein is the prayer recited by Jews upon entering the synagogue; in the Western Ashkenzic rite, it is usually sung before beginning Maariv on Festivals, especially the second night of Yom Tov.

Text

Musical settings
In modern times various composers have developed musical settings for Ma Tovu including:

 Samuel Adler
 Robert Strassburg (1993)
Moshav Band

References

External links
Recordings of tunes to Ma Tovu on the Zemirot Database
Recordings of Ma Tovu spoken in different speeds

Shacharit
Jewish prayer and ritual texts
Hebrew words and phrases in Jewish prayers and blessings